The Nikon F-301 (sold in the United States as the N2000) is a manual focus, autoexposure, auto film loading and advancing 35 mm SLR camera that was sold by the Nikon Corporation beginning in 1985. It was the replacement for the FG.

The F-301 was identical to the Nikon F-501 (sold in North America as the N2020) in almost every way, except it lacked autofocus.

The Nikon F-301 is notable for being the first Nikon SLR sold that lacked a film advance lever. As a result the selector knob, also used to lock the shutter button, has a continuous option in addition to the single shot. It was also the first Nikon SLR to feature DX film decoding.

A standard hotshoe flash mount sits above the viewfinder, with which a flash may be attached to the camera. The Nikon F-301 does not feature a built-in pop-up flash (the F-401 was the first Nikon SLR to have this feature).

It was also the first Nikon to use polycarbonates in the building of the camera, and was considered by many people as the dawn of a new era for Nikon.

This camera is powered by four AAA batteries, loaded from below, necessitating removal of the baseplate. A MB-3 battery pack could be used instead of the standard MB-4 enabling AA batteries to be used instead of AAA. The placement of the batteries meant that the tripod bush on the baseplate was extremely offset from the centre of the camera. The AH-3 tripod adapter could be used to rectify this though it added extra bulk to the camera.

The F-301 can be manually preset for film speeds from ISO 12 to ISO 3200, or this can be left to the camera through the DX feature.

The camera can also be used with the Nikon SB-600 & SB-800 flash units.

External links

F301
F301